Snow King Mountain is a summer and winter resort in the western United States, in Jackson, Wyoming. The mountain is Jackson's original 1936 ski hill, located on the southeast edge of the city, and was the first ski area in Wyoming.  Locals sometimes refer to Snow King as "The Town Hill," and it offers skiing, hiking, an alpine slide, and many other attractions. The ski season runs from December to late March, and has a summer season that runs from June to October. Skiing is offered after the closure of lifts, until the snow is gone thanks to a boot pack trail on the west side of the resorts Runs. Hiking trails are offered all over the mountain.

History
In 1936, the Civilian Conservation Corps created a switch-back horse and hiking trail to the top of the mountain and the trail became one of Snow King's first skiing race courses. The Jackson Hole Ski Club was established in 1937, and two years later lift-served skiing began on Wyoming's first ski area with the addition of a  rope tow. The first chairlift was installed in 1946, a converted ore tram from Colorado. It had four stations, with the first starting where 1 town hill apartments are located. Stations 2 and 3, which were up the hill, were for beginners and intermediate skiers. In 1951, the old single person lift was given an improved upper and lower terminal, new stronger cables and 2 person chairs.

In 1978, The Rafferty double was constructed on the east slopes of the resort near the Snow king Hotel. When completed, it brought a mini golf course and alpine slide. In the summer of 2014, after almost 35 years of service, the Rafferty Double chair was removed to make way for a new and improved base area. With these improvements came the New Rafferty fixed-grip quad chair, a new ticket office, the new Kings grill, a ropes course, mountain coaster, and a new mini golf course. After a few years of increased tourism to the area, a new maze was created just west of the mini golf. In the winter, Rafferty offers Beginner and intermediate runs, while the upper intermediate and expert runs are off of the summit gondola, Cougar, and Backside lift.

This new lift ran a lift line that crossed the old about three-quarters of the way up the mountain. In the spring of 2021, Snow King Resort, Skytrac chairlifts, and Doppelmayr/Garaventa Group began construction of a new eight-passenger Summit Gondola, as well as the Backside quad.

Current Lifts 
Rafferty (YOC 2015)

4pers. Chairlift (fixed-grip)

Length: 920 m · Carrying capacity/hour: 1800

Manufacturer: Doppelmayr

Summit 1981-2021

2pers. Chairlift (fixed-grip)

Length: 1125 m · Carrying capacity/hour: 1150

Manufacturer: CTEC

Cougar (YOC 1994)

3pers. Chairlift (fixed-grip)

Length: 766 m · Carrying capacity/hour: 1200

Manufacturer: Garaventa

Beginner Tow

Rope tow/baby lift with low rope tow

Length: 100 m · Carrying capacity/hour: 500

Manufacturer: Wopfner

Planned Lifts for the 2021-22 season 
planned: Summit Gondola (YOC 2021)

8pers. Gondola lift (monocable circulating ropeway)

Length: 1130 m · Carrying capacity/hour: 2400

Manufacturer: Leitner-Poma

planned: Backside Lift A (YOC 2021)

4pers. Chairlift (fixed-grip)

Carrying capacity/hour: 2000

Manufacturer: Skytrac Inc.

References

1.https://news.google.com/newspapers?id=B7heAAAAIBAJ&sjid=dTAMAAAAIBAJ&pg=2610%2C57132

2. https://liftblog.com/snow-king-mountain-wy/

External links
Snow King Mountain 
Snow King Resort
 Snow King Resort - history of Jackson Hole
 the master plan

Ski areas and resorts in Wyoming
Buildings and structures in Teton County, Wyoming
Jackson, Wyoming
Tourist attractions in Teton County, Wyoming